Liane Malcos (born March 25, 1978) is an American rower. In the 2003 World Rowing Championships, she won a gold medal in the women's coxless four event.

References

See also

American female rowers
World Rowing Championships medalists for the United States
Living people
1978 births
21st-century American women